Events in the year 1862 in Belgium.

Incumbents
Monarch: Leopold I
Head of government: Charles Rogier

Events
 Chimay Brewery founded
 Belgian Catholic Mission to China established

March
 3 March – Leopold I of Belgium writes a letter to the dean of Windsor expressing a desire to be buried alongside his first wife, Princess Charlotte of Wales.
 29 March – Two members of a criminal gang guillotined in Charleroi.

April
 11 April – Belgian Navy abolished.

May
 26 May – Provincial elections

July
 23 July – Anglo-Belgian Treaty of Commerce and Navigation signed.

September
 16 September – Victor Hugo's Brussels publisher, Albert Lacroix, holds a banquet to celebrate the success of Les Misérables

Architecture

 Loppem Castle (designed by E. W. Pugin and Jean-Baptiste Bethune) completed

Publications
Periodicals and series
 Almanach royal officiel (Brussels, H. Tarlier)
 La Belgique Horticole, vol. 12.
 Collection de précis historiques, vol. 11, edited by Edouard Terwecoren S.J.
 L'Education de la Femme begins publication
 Recueil des lois et arrêtés royaux de Belgique, vol. 49 (Brussels, Imprimerie du Moniteur Belge)
 Revue belge et étrangère, vol. 13.
 De Vlaemsche school: tijdschrift voor kunsten, letteren, wetenschappen, ouheidskunde en kunstnyverheid, vol. 8.

Monographs and reports
 Robert Scott Burn, Notes of an Agricultural Tour in Belgium, Holland, & the Rhine (London, Longman, Green, Longman, Roberts & Green)
 Louis Galesloot, Procès de François Anneessens, doyen du corps des métiers de Bruxelles, vol. 1 (Brussels and The Hague)

Literature and the arts
 Maria Doolaeghe, Sinte Godelieve, Vlaemsche legende uit de XIde eeuw
 Guido Gezelle, Gedichten, Gezangen en Gebeden
 Victor Hugo, Les Misérables, published in Brussels, then in Paris and Leipzig by A. Lacroix, Verboeckhoven & Cie.
 William Henry James Weale, Restauration des monuments publics en Belgique, second edition

Births
 19 June – Paul Saintenoy, architect (died 1952)
 29 August – Maurice Maeterlinck, author (died 1949)
 10 December – Georges Hulin de Loo, art historian (died 1945)

Deaths
January
29 January – Louis-Joseph Seutin (born 1793), surgeon and senator

March
 10 March – Pieter van Hanselaere (born 1786), painter

August
 5 August – Felix de Muelenaere (born 1793), Catholic politician

December
 8 December – Pierre-Théodore Verhaegen (born 1796), liberal politician

References

 
Belgium
Years of the 19th century in Belgium
1860s in Belgium
Belgium